Burtnieki Parish is an administrative territorial entity of Valmiera Municipality in the Vidzeme region of Latvia.

References

Parishes of Latvia
Valmiera Municipality
Vidzeme